Rebecca Lynn Gulsvig (born August 25, 1982) is an American stage actress.

Early life 
Gulsvig was born in Moorhead, Minnesota, the daughter of Patricia Kay (née Nelson) and Kristofer Gulsvig. She is of Norwegian heritage. Her mother is a teacher and her father is a financial advisor. She attended Moorhead High School, Trollwood Performing Arts School, and the Red River Dance and Performing Company.

Career 
Gulsvig's first role was that of Wendy in a touring production of Peter Pan. She has performed on Broadway in Hairspray as Amber Von Tussle and originated the role of Leilani in the Broadway production of Legally Blonde the Musical, understudying the roles of Elle Woods, Serena, and Margot. She can also be seen on a Verizon commercial. She starred as Elle Woods in the North American national tour of Legally Blonde the Musical when the tour started in September 2008, until it ended in August 2010. For this role she was nominated for the 2009 Helen Hayes Award for Outstanding Lead Actress in a Non-Resident Production. Gulsvig performed the song "So Much Better" live at the 2009 Tony Awards ceremony.

In 2015, Gulsvig played Cynthia Weil in the U.S. national tour of Beautiful: The Carole King Musical. On October 10, 2016, Gulsvig returned to Broadway in School of Rock in the role of Patty.

Beginning October 2018, Gulsvig played Beverley Bass in the national tour of Come from Away through mid-2019. In October 2019, it was announced that she would be succeeding Jenn Colella, who originated the role, in the Broadway company starting November 12, 2019. It was announced on January 22, 2020, that Gulsvig would play her final performance in the role on March 1 and would be replaced by Rachel Tucker.

Personal life 
In 2006, Gulsvig married Tyler Fisher, whom she met while working on a cruise ship.

Stage appearances

References

External links 
 Official Website
 
 

1982 births
American musical theatre actresses
Living people
21st-century American women